Grant Doyle (born 9 January 1974) is a former professional tennis player from Australia. He is the CEO and owner of Advantage Doyle Tennis Academies.

Junior career
Doyle won four junior Grand Slam titles during his early years. He and partner Joshua Eagle were boys' doubles champions at the 1991 Australian Open. In 1992, he became the number one ranked junior in the world. With new partner Brad Sceney, Doyle won the doubles again in the 1992 Australian Open and was also the singles champion, dropping just two games in his defeat of Brian Dunn in the final. He was a doubles winner at the 1992 French Open, partnering Mexican Enrique Abaroa and won the singles title in that year's Queen's Junior Championships.

ATP Tour
Doyle was a doubles semi-finalist in the 1993 Australian Men's Hardcourt Championships, held in Adelaide, with Eagle as his partner.

As a singles player, he had his best result at the 1997 Sybase Open in San Jose, California, making the quarter-finals, with wins over Brian MacPhie and Jeff Tarango.

Doyle made eight main draw appearances in singles at Grand Slam level. Although he didn't ever proceed past the first round, he came close when he lost 5–7 in the fifth set to Wayne Black at the 1995 Australian Open and also in another five-set loss at the 1996 French Open, to Greg Rusedski, with the same fifth set score.

Every year from 1991 to 1999, Doyle appeared in the men's doubles at the Australian Open. He twice reached the round of 16, with Eagle in 1992 and later partnering Ben Ellwood in the 1999 Australian Open. His run with Ellwood included a win over 12th seeds Donald Johnson and Francisco Montana.

Coaching
Doyle is currently coaching young American Ryan Harrison and has previously worked as the coach of Sam Querrey.

Junior Grand Slam finals

Singles: 1 (1 title)

Doubles: 3 (3 titles)

ATP Challenger and ITF Futures finals

Singles: 2 (0–2)

Doubles: 11 (5–6)

Performance timelines

Singles

Doubles

References

External links
 
 

1974 births
Living people
Australian male tennis players
Australian Open (tennis) junior champions
French Open junior champions
Tennis people from New South Wales
Grand Slam (tennis) champions in boys' singles
Grand Slam (tennis) champions in boys' doubles
20th-century Australian people
21st-century Australian people